The Upper Silesian Coal Basin is a coal basin in Silesia, in Poland and the Czech Republic.

The Basin also contains a number of other minable resources, such as methane, cadmium, lead, silver and zinc. Coal depth is approximately 1000 meters, and contains about 70 billion tons, with excellent extraction potential.

Industrial areas within the Upper Silesian Coal Basin:
Upper Silesian Industrial Region
Rybnik Coal Area
Ostrava-Karviná Coal Area

The Upper Silesian Coal Basin lies in the provinces of Upper Silesia and Zagłębie Dąbrowskie in southern Poland, in a highland located between the upper Vistula and the upper Oder rivers, as well as extending into the Moravian-Silesian Region in the Czech Republic. The Upper Silesian Coal Basin includes the Silesian metropolitan area and has a population of 5,294,000 (with 4,311,000 in Poland and 983,000 in the Czech Republic). Area: 5,400 km² (in Poland - 4,500 km², in Czech Republic - 900 km²).

See also
 Coal mining in Poland

References

Literature
 "Historia badań i stan rozpoznania hydrogeologicznego Górnośląskiego Zagłębia Węglowego" / "History and State of Hydrological Investigations of the Upper Silesian Coal Basin" - Andrzej Różkowski, University of Silesia, Katowice 2008, 
 "Geologia i bogactwa mineralne Górnego Śląska i obszarów przyległych" - Wiesław Gabzdyl & Marian Gorol, Silesian University of Technology 2009, 

Silesian Voivodeship
Economy of Poland
Mining in Poland
Economy of the Czech Republic